The K VIII-class submarine was a three boat class of submarines of the Koninklijke Marine (Royal Netherlands Navy). The class varied from  due to the removal of two external torpedo tubes, which were removed to reduce the boats' vulnerability to depth charging.

All ships were still in service at the start of World War II. During the war K IX was transferred to the Royal Australian Navy and renamed K9.

Boats

References
Description of class

 
Submarine classes